Marie-Claude Mattéi-Müller is a Franco-Venezuelan anthropologist and ethnolinguist, professor of the Central University of Venezuela. She has published several works about the indigenous languages in Venezuela. Among the languages included in her works are the yanomamö idioms, panare, hodï and the yawarana. In 2009 Mattéi-Müller received the National Prize of Science and Technology, mention on Social Sciences, along Jacinto Serowe.

References

External links
Marie Claude Matthéi-Müller en proyecto de documentación de idiomas indígenas de la National Science Foundation

Venezuelan anthropologists
Venezuelan women anthropologists
French anthropologists
French women anthropologists
Venezuelan women scientists
French women scientists
Linguists from Venezuela
Academic staff of the Central University of Venezuela
Venezuelan women educators